The 1990–91 Indiana Hoosiers men's basketball team represented Indiana University. Their head coach was Bobby Knight, who was in his 20th year. The team played its home games in Assembly Hall in Bloomington, Indiana, and was a member of the Big Ten Conference.

The Hoosiers finished the regular season with an overall record of 29–5 and a conference record of 15–3, finishing 1st in the Big Ten Conference. As Big Ten Conference Champions, the Hoosiers were invited to participate in the 1991 NCAA tournament as a 2-seed, where IU advanced to the Sweet Sixteen.

Roster

Schedule/Results

|-
!colspan=8| Regular Season
|-

|-
!colspan=8| NCAA tournament

Rankings

References

Indiana Hoosiers men's basketball seasons
Indiana
Hoos
Hoos
Indiana